The Hyundai Eon is a city car produced by the South Korean manufacturer Hyundai. It was launched on 13 October 2011 in India, March 2012 in the Philippines, June 2012 in Vietnam, and June 2014 in Sri Lanka. It was being also sold in Honduras, Nepal, El Salvador, Nicaragua, Chile, Peru, Panama, and Colombia and discontinued in India and other markets in the year 2019. It is also called the Hyundai Atos Eon in several markets.

The Eon is produced in India at Hyundai's Chennai plant for the domestic and export markets as the company's entry level city car, positioned below the Hyundai i10 and Hyundai Atos. It was only exported throughout Latin America, Africa and several Asian countries.

Overview
The Eon was designed jointly between the Hyundai R&D centers in Namyang, South Korea, and Hyderabad, India. It is offered with an 814cc three-cylinder petrol engine that generates  and  torque. The car is equipped with 13-inch wheels fitted with 155/70 R13 tyres.

In January 2012, Hyundai India announced LPG models of Eon as well. These models have a 34 L toroidal tank with an additional cost of approximately INR 27,000 to the available models.

In May 2014, Hyundai released a variant of the Eon with the 1.0-litre Kappa II three-cylinder engine also found in the European Hyundai i10 and Kia Picanto.

In April 2017, Hyundai Asia Resources Incorporated (HARI) opened its Hyundai Assembly Center (HAC) in Santa Rosa to meet the increasing demand of the Eon in the Philippines. The plant also produces the Hyundai H350.

Facelift
As Eon monthly sales have reached 10,000 units in India, Hyundai had given the car a facelift for the 2014 model year.

2017 marked the introduction of the Eon 'Sports Edition'. The 0.8 L limited edition model added more equipment and styling enhancements over the Era+ and Magna+ variants that it is based on. Sold only in Polar White, exterior enhancements include side body mouldings and roof rails, while the interior gains a  touchscreen infotainment system with Phone-Link.

Engine

Safety
Models available in the Philippines (before 2016 MY) are sold with airbags on the top-spec GLS variant but not on the GLX (starting 2016 MY) and GL variant. However, in the Indian market, a driver's side airbag is standard on Sportz and Magna+ (1.0 L) variants, and optional on Era+ and Magna+ (0.8 L) models.
In 2016, tests conducted by Global NCAP awarded the Eon for India (without airbag and with no ABS) with a 0-star rating (similar to Latin NCAP 2013). Many entry-level competitors sold in the Indian market also achieved this rating. Driver protection was rated as poor and front passenger protection was rated marginal (albeit with possible danger of knee impact).

Discontinuation
In August 2018, Hyundai Motor India Pvt. Ltd announced that the Eon will be discontinued by the end of September 2019, as the car is not compliant with new safety regulations that will be implemented in October 2019 and the Bharat Stage VI emissions regulations that will be enforced in April 2020. Its replacement, the third generation Santro, had been released before the festive season of 2018.

The last Hyundai Eon rolled off the line on May 3, 2019, at the Hyundai Asia Resources Inc. Manufacturing Plant in Santa Rosa, Laguna. The China-built Reina sedan serves as the Eon's replacement in the Philippine market.

Gallery

References

External links

2010s cars
Cars introduced in 2011
Cars of India
City cars
Front-wheel-drive vehicles
Hatchbacks
Eon
Eon
Global NCAP superminis